In enzymology, a glucose 1-dehydrogenase is an enzyme that catalyzes the chemical reaction

beta-D-glucose + NAD(P)+  D-glucono-1,5-lactone + NAD(P)H + H+

The 3 substrates of this enzyme are beta-D-glucose, NAD+, and NADP+, whereas its 4 products are D-glucono-1,5-lactone, NADH, NADPH, and H+.

This enzyme belongs to the family of oxidoreductases, specifically those acting on the CH-OH group of donor with NAD+ or NADP+ as acceptor. The systematic name of this enzyme class is beta-D-glucose:NAD(P)+ 1-oxidoreductase. Another name in common use is D-glucose dehydrogenase (NAD(P)+).

Structural studies

References

 
 
 
 
 

EC 1.1.1
NADPH-dependent enzymes
NADH-dependent enzymes
Enzymes of known structure